In Norse mythology, Njörun (Old Norse: Njǫrun , sometimes modernly anglicized as Niorun) is a goddess attested in the Prose Edda, written in the 13th century by Snorri Sturluson, and various kennings (including once in the Poetic Edda). Scholarly theories concerning her name and function in the pantheon include etymological connections to the Norse god Njörðr and the Roman goddess Nerio, and suggestions that she may represent the earth or be the unnamed sister-wife of Njörðr.

Attestations
Njörun is listed (after Bil) as an ásynja within the Prose Edda book Skáldskaparmál. No further information other than her name is provided there. In addition, the name occurs in kennings for women in poetry by Kormákr Ögmundarson, Hrafn Önundarson and Rögnvaldr Kali as well as in Krákumál and verses in Íslendinga saga, Njáls saga and Harðar saga. Eld-Njörun (meaning "fire-Njörun") occurs in women kennings in poetry by Gísli Súrsson and Björn Breiðvíkingakappi while hól-Njörun occurs in a somewhat dubious kenning in a stanza by Björn hítdælakappi. Draum-Njörun (meaning "dream-Njörun") is cited in the Poetic Edda poem Alvíssmál as a word from the language of the dwarfs for the night. The same word occurs in Nafnaþulur.

Theories
Njörun is a "mysterious ... figure" of whom nothing else is known; Andy Orchard suggests that she may be fictitious. Several scholars have suggested that the stem syllable in her name, Njǫr-, may represent the element *ner- as in Tacitus' earth-goddess Nerthus (*Ner-þuz), whose name is etymologically identical with that of the Norse god Njǫrðr, and that Njörun may therefore be a name for the earth. Ásgeir Blöndal Magnússon additionally suggests a connection with the Roman goddess Nerio.

The possible etymological connection with Njǫrðr and Nerthus suggests that Njörun may be a preserved name for the sister-wife of Njörðr, who is highly unusual in the Old Norse context in being unnamed. As was noted by Albert Morey Sturtevant, Njǫrun and Gefjon are the only female names recorded in Old Norse texts that have the suffix -un. Two other god-goddess pairs distinguished by suffix are preserved in the Old Norse corpus, Ullr and Ullin and Fjörgyn and Fjörgynn, and there is a possible third example in Old High German Phol and Volla.

Notes

References

 Ásgeir Blöndal Magnússon (1989). Íslensk orðsifjabók. Orðabók Háskólans.
 Faulkes, Anthony (Trans.) (1995). Edda. Everyman. 
 Finnur Jónsson (1913). Goðafræði Norðmanna og Íslendinga eftir heimildum. Hið íslenska bókmentafjelag.
 Finnur Jónsson (1931). Lexicon poeticum. S. L. Møllers bogtrykkeri.
 Hopkins, Joseph (2012). "Goddesses Unknown I: Njǫrun and the Sister-Wife of Njǫrðr". RMN Newsletter; volume 5. pp. 39–44.
 Orchard, Andy (1997). Dictionary of Norse Myth and Legend. Cassell. 
 Sturtevant, Albert Morey (1952). "Regarding the Old Norse name Gefjon" as published in Scandinavian Studies; volume 24 (number 4, November). ISSN 0036-5637

Ásynjur
Earth goddesses